van Den Bosch syndrome is a rare X-linked syndrome like intellectual disability. It may be caused by a small X-chromosome deletion.

The condition can be detected around infancy.

Epidemiology 
According to Orphanet the condition occurs in 1 in 1 million people.

It has been reported in only one family.

Symptoms 
Symptoms for the condition include.
 Abnormal electroretinogram
 Acrokeratosis
 Anhidrotic ectodermal dysplasia
 Choroideremia
 Heat intolerance
 High myopia
 Horizontal nystagmus
 Intellectual disability
 Recurrent respiratory infections
 Recurrent skin infections
 Scapular winging
 Unfavorable response of muscle weakness to acetylcholine esterase inhibitors
 skeletal abnormality
 Anhidrosis
 Contiguous gene syndrome
 X-linked inheritance

History 
It was first described by J. Van den Bosch in 1959. He reported the condition in 2 brothers. The condition was found in more males spanning three generations. According to Orphanet there have been no more descriptions in literature since 1959.

References 

Syndromes with intellectual disability